San Germano may refer to:
 San Germano Chisone, a municipality in the Province of Turin in Piedmont
 San Germano dei Berici, a municipality in the Province of  Vicenza in the Veneto
 San Germano Vercellese, a municipality in the Province of Vercelli in Piedmont
 Cassino (FR) or San Germano, a district in the Province of Frosinone in Lazio, known for its abbey and the World War II Battle of Monte Cassino
 San Germano, a district of the commune of Casale Monferrato in the Province of Alessandria in Piedmont